Lafayette Park may refer to a location in the United States:

Lafayette Park (Los Angeles), California
Lafayette Park (Fall River, Massachusetts)
Lafayette Park (San Francisco), California
Lafayette Park, Detroit, Michigan, a park, development, and neighborhood
Lafayette Park, St. Louis, Missouri, surrounded by Lafayette Square
Lafayette Park Historic District, Albany, New York
Lafayette Park, Norfolk, Virginia, adjacent to the Virginia Zoological Park
Lafayette Square, Washington, D.C., the northern part of President's Park in Washington, D.C.